Elections to Down District Council were held on 21 May 1997 on the same day as the other Northern Irish local government elections. The election used four district electoral areas to elect a total of 23 councillors.

Election results

Note: "Votes" are the first preference votes.

Districts summary

|- class="unsortable" align="centre"
!rowspan=2 align="left"|Ward
! % 
!Cllrs
! % 
!Cllrs
! %
!Cllrs
! %
!Cllrs
! % 
!Cllrs
! % 
!Cllrs
!rowspan=2|TotalCllrs
|- class="unsortable" align="center"
!colspan=2 bgcolor="" | SDLP
!colspan=2 bgcolor="" | UUP
!colspan=2 bgcolor="" | DUP
!colspan=2 bgcolor="" | Sinn Féin
!colspan=2 bgcolor="" | NIWC
!colspan=2 bgcolor="white"| Others
|-
|align="left"|Ballynahinch
|bgcolor="#99FF66"|46.8
|bgcolor="#99FF66"|3
|24.0
|1
|24.9
|1
|4.3
|0
|0.0
|0
|0.0
|0
|5
|-
|align="left"|Downpatrick
|bgcolor="#99FF66"|61.0
|bgcolor="#99FF66"|5
|13.2
|1
|0.0
|0
|10.8
|1
|0.0
|0
|15.0
|0
|7
|-
|align="left"|Newcastle
|bgcolor="#99FF66"|47.2
|bgcolor="#99FF66"|3
|17.6
|1
|9.4
|0
|14.2
|1
|7.4
|1
|4.2
|0
|6
|-
|align="left"|Rowallane
|26.6
|1
|bgcolor="40BFF5"|43.9
|bgcolor="40BFF5"|3
|15.1
|1
|0.0
|0
|0.0
|0
|14.4
|0
|5
|- class="unsortable" class="sortbottom" style="background:#C9C9C9"
|align="left"| Total
|46.0
|12
|24.1
|6
|11.9
|2
|7.6
|2
|1.9
|1
|8.5
|0
|23
|-
|}

Districts results

Ballynahinch

1993: 2 x SDLP, 2 x UUP, 1 x DUP
1997: 3 x SDLP, 1 x UUP, 1 x DUP
1993-1997 Change: SDLP gain from UUP

Downpatrick

1993: 6 x SDLP, 1 x UUP
1997: 5 x SDLP, 1 x Sinn Féin, 1 x UUP
1993-1997 Change: Sinn Féin gain from SDLP

Newcastle

1993: 4 x SDLP, 1 x UUP, 1 x DUP
1997: 3 x SDLP, 1 x UUP, 1 x Sinn Féin, 1 x Women's Coalition
1993-1997 Change: Sinn Féin and Women's Coalition gain from SDLP and DUP

Rowallane

1993: 3 x UUP, 1 x DUP, 1 x SDLP
1997: 3 x UUP, 1 x DUP, 1 x SDLP
1993-1997 Change: No change

References

Down District Council elections
Down